Automated Anatomical Labeling (AAL) (or Anatomical Automatic Labeling) is a software package and digital atlas of the human brain.
It is typically used in functional neuroimaging-based research to obtain neuroanatomical labels for the locations in 3-dimensional space where the measurements of some aspect of brain function were captured. In other words, it projects the divisions in the brain atlas onto brain-shaped volumes of functional data.

It is developed by a French research group based in Caen and described further in the following scientific article:
 
The AAL program is dependent upon the Matlab and SPM programs, but the digital human brain atlas itself can also be found elsewhere—within the MRIcron program, for example.

External links
 Automated Anatomical Labeling at Cyceron.

Neuroscience software